Robert Emil Eichhorn (9 October 1863 – 26 July 1925) was a German politician, journalist and Chief of the Berlin Police during the 1918–1919 German Revolution.

Eichhorn was born in Röhrsdorf near Chemnitz in October 1863 and became apprenticed as a glass worker in 1878, becoming active in the Social Democratic Party of Germany (SPD). He became a full-time official in 1893 and was the head of its press office from 1908–17, when he left with others to form the USPD where he played a similar role. Eichorn worked for the post-revolutionary Russian Telegraph Agency in Berlin.

On 9 November 1918 he led the occupation of police headquarters in Berlin, the infantry guarding the building surrendering their weapons without a struggle. Inside the building Eichhorn took over the office of police chief and 600 political prisoners were set free. Amongst his deputies was Revolutionary Stewards activist Anton Grylewicz.

The attempt to dismiss Eichhorn by the Prussian cabinet on 4 January 1919 and to replace him with the SPD politician Eugen Ernst provoked mass opposition and a general strike, with Eichhorn declaring the following day in front of a mass demonstration of 200,000, "I got my job from the Revolution, and I shall give it up only to the Revolution." The attempt to remove Eichhorn had been preceded by slander in Vorwärts accusing him of having received Russian gold, possessing stolen foodstuffs and illegally bought arms. On 6 January both the Central Committee of the councils and the Berlin executive approved the decision to remove Eichhorn, however earlier that day supporters of Eichhorn had occupied several building including the Vorwärts office which was the precursor to the Spartacist uprising.

In 1920, Eichhorn joined the KPD when it merged with the USPD left, but left after Paul Levi was expelled in 1921, although he remained a KPD deputy until he died in Berlin in July 1925.

References

External links 
 Spartacus Educational page on Eichhorn
 

1863 births
1925 deaths
Social Democratic Party of Germany politicians
Independent Social Democratic Party politicians
Communist Party of Germany politicians
Members of the Reichstag of the Weimar Republic